Edward Tate (30 August 1877 – 4 January 1953) was an English cricketer who played first-class cricket for Hampshire from 1898 to 1902. He was a right-arm medium pace bowler and right-handed batsman.

Tate made his first-class debut for Hampshire against Yorkshire in the 1898 County Championship, when he took 5/83 in Yorkshire's first innings. Tate represented Hampshire in 29 first-class matches from 1898 to 1902. His final appearance for the county came against Warwickshire in 1902. Tate took 56 wickets for the club at a bowling average of 31.03, with best figures of 8/51 which came against Somerset in 1898; a match which also gave Tate his only ten wickets in a match, with match figures of 11/114.

In addition to representing Hampshire, Tate also played for the Marylebone Cricket Club, making his debut for the club against Lancashire in 1899. Tate represented the club five times between 1899 and 1902, with his fifth and final appearance coming against Nottinghamshire. He also played a single first-class match for AJ Webbe's XI against Oxford University, when he took six wickets in the match.

Tate joined Devon in 1910, making his debut for the county in the 1910 Minor Counties Championship against Cornwall. He played for Devon regularly until 1914. During the First World War, Tate served with the Royal Artillery in northern France. After the war he returned to play for Devon in the Minor Counties Championship from 1920 to 1923.

Tate served as cricket professional and manager of the college store at Malvern College in Worcestershire for 50 years. He died at Malvern on 4 January 1953.

References

External links
Edward Tate at Cricinfo
Edward Tate at CricketArchive

1877 births
1953 deaths
People from Lyndhurst, Hampshire
English cricketers
Hampshire cricketers
Marylebone Cricket Club cricketers
Devon cricketers
British Army personnel of World War I
Royal Artillery soldiers
A. J. Webbe's XI cricketers